Ryan Milton Rohm (born 22 December 1957, Gastonia, North Carolina) is an American string theorist. He is one of four physicists known as the Princeton string quartet, and is responsible for the development of heterotic string theory along with David Gross, Jeffrey A. Harvey and Emil Martinec, the other members of the Princeton String Quartet.

Rohm studied physics and mathematics at North Carolina State University (NCSU) with bachelor's degree in 1980 and received a Ph.D. in physics from Princeton University in 1985. He was a postdoc from 1985 to 1988 at Caltech. From 1988 to 1995 he was an assistant professor at Boston University. In 1997 he earned a master's degree in computer science at NCSU.  Since 1998 he has worked on experimental neutrino physics in the KamLAND experiment and at the Triangle Universities Nuclear Laboratory (TUNL). Since 1997 he has also been an adjunct professor at the University of North Carolina at Chapel Hill.

Selected publications

Spontaneous supersymmetry breaking in supersymmetric string theories, Nuclear Physics B, vol. 237, 1984, p. 553

References

American string theorists
21st-century American physicists
1957 births
Living people